Bustryk  is a village in the administrative district of Gmina Poronin, within Tatra County, Lesser Poland Voivodeship, in southern Poland.

The village has a population of 720.

References

Villages in Tatra County